The year 2017 was the ninth year in the history of BRACE, a mixed martial arts promotion based in Australia.

Events list

Brace 52 

Brace 52 was an event held on November 11, 2017, at AIS Arena in Canberra, Australia.

Results

Brace 51 

Brace 51 was an event held on October 28, 2017, at Big Top Luna Park in Sydney, Australia.

Results

Brace 50 

Brace 50 was an event held on May 13, 2017, at Township Auditorium in Townsville, Australia.

Results

Brace 49 

Brace 49 was an event held on April 8, 2017, at AIS Arena in Canberra, Australia.

Results

Brace 47

Brace 47 was an event held on March 18, 2017, at Big Top Luna Park in Sydney, Australia.

Results

Brace 46

Brace 46 was expected to be held  on March 4, 2017, at RSL Southport in Gold Coast, Australia, and it was cancelled.

References 

2017 in mixed martial arts
2017 in Australian sport
BRACE (mixed martial arts) events